Ziyad Al-Sahafi (born 3 February 1994) is a Saudi Arabian footballer who plays as a defender and midfielder for Al-Taawoun on loan from Al-Ittihad in the Saudi Professional League.

Career
On 31 August 2022, Al-Sahafi joined Al-Taawoun on loan from Al-Ittihad.

Career statistics

Club

Honours
Al-Ittihad
King Cup: 2018
Crown Prince Cup: 2016–17

References

External links
 

Living people
1994 births
Sportspeople from Jeddah
Saudi Arabian footballers
Saudi Arabia international footballers
Ittihad FC players
Al-Taawoun FC players
Saudi Professional League players
Association football defenders
Association football midfielders